Robert Mariusz Janowski (born October 9, 1961 in Inowrocław) is a Polish singer, TV presenter and musical journalist. Veterinarian by profession. Known for the role of Jan in Metro musical in 90s and for hosting Jaka to melodia? TV programme (Polish Name That Tune) in 1997–2018. Besides of his acting and musical achievements, Janowski has also published severals books of poetry.

References 

1961 births
Living people
People from Inowrocław
Polish veterinarians
20th-century Polish  male singers